Madison Township is one of sixteen townships in Hancock County, Iowa, USA. At the 2000 census, its population was 775.

History
Madison Township was organized in 1858.

Geography
According to the United States Census Bureau, Madison Township covers an area of 35 square miles (90.65 square kilometers).

Cities, towns, villages
 Forest City (south one-third)

Unincorporated towns
 Hawley at 
 Hayfield at 
(This list is based on USGS data and may include former settlements.)

Adjacent townships
 Forest Township, Winnebago County (north)
 Mount Valley Township, Winnebago County (northeast)
 Ellington Township (east)
 Concord Township (southeast)
 Garfield Township (south)
 Britt Township (southwest)
 Crystal Township (west)
 Linden Township, Winnebago County (northwest)

Cemeteries
The township contains Madison Cemetery.

Major highways
  U.S. Route 69

Airports and landing strips
 Forest City Municipal Airport

School districts
 Forest City Community School District
 Garner-Hayfield-Ventura Community School District
 Woden-Crystal Lake Community School District [defunct, absolved by neighboring districts]

Political districts
 Iowa's 4th congressional district
 State House District 11
 State Senate District 6

References
 United States Census Bureau 2008 TIGER/Line Shapefiles
 United States Board on Geographic Names (GNIS)
 United States National Atlas

External links
 US-Counties.com
 City-Data.com

Townships in Hancock County, Iowa
Townships in Iowa